Lisa Kneip (born 1 April 2002) is a Luxembourger footballer who plays as a midfielder for Dames Ligue 1 club SC Ell and the Luxembourg women's national team.

International career
Kneip made her senior debut for Luxembourg on 16 February 2022 during a 5–0 friendly win against Tahiti.

References

2002 births
Living people
Women's association football midfielders
Luxembourgian women's footballers
Luxembourg women's international footballers